Flexicar is an Melbourne membership-based carsharing service owned by Hertz. The company provides automobile reservations to its members, billable by the hour or day. Flexicar was co-founded in 2004 by Monique Conheady and five other partners. In 2008, Conheady was awarded the Winston Churchill Fellowship to investigate public transport systems all over the world that use the latest technology and incorporate new forms of transport like bicycle sharing.

Flexicar has been a partner of Honda in 2009 for sharing their mutual commitment to sustainability. Honda provided two Honda Civic Hybrids, a low fuel emission car, to Flexicar as an initiative for sustainable driving.

In 2010, Flexicar won an award for Transportation, Warehousing and Logistics – Mindful Movement (supported by Banksia Environmental Foundation).

Flexicar fleet 
 BMW 118i 
 Hyundai Accent 
 Hyundai Elantra 
 Hyundai i30 
 Hyundai i30 Touring Wagon
 Hyundai ix35 
 Kia Cerato 
 Nissan Dualis 
 Nissan Pulsar 
 Nissan Qashqai  
 Nissan X-Trail 
 Toyota Corolla  
 Toyota Prius C 
 Toyota Prius V 
 Toyota Yaris 
 VW Golf 
 VW Polo

Recognition
Flexicar has won and been a finalist in several environmental awards including:
 2012 Churchill Fellowship awarded to Monique Conheady to investigate public transport systems using the latest technology to incorporate new forms of transport like bicycle and carsharing.
 2010 Transportation, Warehousing and Logistics Award winner – Mindful Movement (supported by Banksia Environmental Foundation) 
 2009 Victorian Telstra Business Women's Award awarded to Monique Conheady

See also
 Hertz Corporation

References 

Car rental companies of Australia
Carsharing
Sustainable transport
Companies based in Melbourne